Edgar Chapman (1831 – 11 September 1886) was a brewer and businessman in Adelaide, South Australia, closely associated with the Theatre Royal.

History

James Chapman, a tailor and draper of Kent, England, emigrated to South Australia with his wife Mary and their seven children aboard Rajah, arriving at Adelaide in April 1850. He founded a drapery on Hindley Street, at that time the premier business strip in the young city.

His eldest son Edgar Chapman joined with W. K. Simms in 1865 as Simms & Chapman to operate West End Brewery, which Simms had purchased in 1861. The partnership was dissolved in 1879.

Chapman and Caleb Peacock were passengers on the steamer Auckland when she struck a reef between Cape Conran and Cape Everard, on 27 May 1871. The ship was lost but all aboard were rescued by the Macedon.

Chapman invested in commercial property on fashionable Hindley Street. In October 1876 he purchased the Theatre Royal, its hotel and the adjoining shops for £11,000, and lost no time in appointing George R. Johnson architect for a complete rebuild of the theatre. The rebuilt house, costing about £20,000, was opened on 25 March 1878.

In 1878, on the eve of the departure of Mr. and Mrs Chapman and their daughters Clara, Emily Fannie and Lily for a European holiday, he was presented by a throng of prominent citizens with a pair of diamond studs valued at £250 (perhaps $50,000 today), the work of J. M. Wendt. While on holiday he booked various acts for Australia, but with James Alison also leased Drury Lane for an Australian production of Henry V starring George Rignold, perhaps doing something to refute criticisms by the Christian Colonist.

Beside the Theatre Royal and Theatre Royal Hotel, other properties owned by Chapman in Hindley street were the Eagle Tavern and shops owned by Burns the tailor, McKenzie, Bristow, and Lipman.

His sons Charles E. Chapman and Harry A. Chapman ran Mundowdna Station. They voluntarily declared insolvency in order to be relieved of the debt they owed to their father.

He died after three or four years of declining health, and his remains were interred at the West Terrace Cemetery. His estate was proved at £59,000 (perhaps $10 million today).

His brother Arthur took over management of his estate, which included the Theatre Royal in Hindley Street, though he was acting for Edgar as early as 1883, In January 1885 he had joined Rignold and Allison as lessee and in December they withdrew from the partnership, leaving Chapman as sole manager until Wybert Reeve became lessee in 1887.
Arthur Chapman initiated extensive alterations in 1905 at a cost of over £4,000 and a rebuild of the theatre in 1913–1914 at a cost of £21,000.

Other interests
He was appointed Justice of the Peace 1877.

He was interested in horse racing; served as a steward at the "Old Course" (Victoria Park).

Chapman's affair with the theatre was not only financial. He had a passable singing voice, and "trod the boards" on occasion: In 1880 he played "King Artexomines" in Rhodes's Bombastes Furioso.

In 1882 he had several landscapes painted to order by H. J. Johnstone.

Family
James Chapman (1804 – 15 June 1879) married Mary Stanford (1804 – September 1895). Their children included:
Stanford Chapman (1829 – 8 October 1905) married Martha Moon ( – 6 August 1912) in London on 9 December 1854. He was admitted to the firm of Virgoe, Son in 1865, became  Virgoe, Son & Chapman, of Melbourne and Sydney, lived in Hawthorn then Kew, Victoria 
Alice Mary Chapman (2 December 1855 – 19 August 1911) married John Donaldson of Victoria
Horace Marchent Chapman (17 November 1860 – )
Edith Annie Chapman (19 December 1863 – ) married William St. Clair ( – ) on 11 December 1889
Herbert Henry Chapman (17 January 1868 – 31 January 1912) born in Victoria
Edgar Chapman (1831 – 11 September 1886) married Frances Rachael Kelsh ( – 1890) in 1853
Charles Edgar Chapman (1854 – 4 September 1920) married to Margaret Teresa Chapman (c. 1861 – 3 January 1916)
Clara Mary Chapman (1856 – 25 September 1925) married Clement Ferdinand Vaux Rainsford (c. 1859 – 12 September 1935) in 1882
Harry Albert Chapman (1858 – ) sheep farmer with brother C. E. Chapman; insolvent 1883
Emma Victoria Chapman (1860 – )
Edgar Stanford Chapman (21 March 1862 – 11 November 1872) The lad fell into a vat of hot hops liquor at the West Terrace brewery, and drowned
Fanny Emily Chapman (30 September 1863 – 1886) married Edward Headly/Heasley Hallack in 1885, his second wife
Lily Kate Chapman (23 June 1865 – ) married James Cunningham on 16 April 1890
Albert Chapman (1834 – 21 June 1902) of Paddington, Sydney
Emma Chapman  (1836 – 15 November 1896)
Arthur Chapman (1838 – 8 May 1909)  married Sarah Bullock ( – 27 September 1904) in 1863. She was the eldest daughter of John Bullock
Frederick Arthur Chapman (10 March 1864 – 18 September 1925) of Lion Brewing and Malting Company
Stanley Irwin Chapman (1892 –29 September 1940) also  of Lion Brewing and Malting Co.
Laura Simmons Chapman (13 May 1865 – 31 December 1946) married Arthur White ( – 20 June 1943) on 11 December 1901
Percy James Chapman (30 December 1866 – 4 January 1946) married Mabel Adelaide Barnfield in 1896
Arthur Ernest Chapman (1868 – 20 January 1890)

Nina Blanche Chapman (1874 – 30 July 1952) married Frederick Charles Sach on 8 November 1911
Frank Burley "Jack" Chapman (1877 – 4 March 1917) married Agnes, killed in France, WWI
Mary Chapman (1840–1910)
Louisa  Chapman (1844 – 25 September 1883) lived with her mother, King William Street south

References 

1838 births
1909 deaths
History of Adelaide
Australian theatre owners
Australian brewers
19th-century Australian businesspeople
Businesspeople from Adelaide
Australian people of English descent